David Kirsh (born 1950) is a Canadian cognitive scientist, and Professor / Past Dept. Chair of Cognitive Science at University of California, San Diego (UCSD), where he heads the Interactive Cognition Lab.

Biography 
He received his BA from the University of Toronto in 1976 and his D.Phil. from the University of Oxford in 1983 with the thesis Representation and rationality: foundations of cognitive science. At Oxford he studied under A.J. Ayer and Gareth Evans.

Prior to arriving at UCSD, he spent five years as a research scientist at the MIT Artificial Intelligence Laboratory from 1984 to 1989. Since 1989, he has been on faculty at the Department of Cognitive Science at University of California, San Diego (UCSD). Since 1989, he has also been director of the Interactive Cognition Lab.

His research interests include interactive design, collaborative environments, cognitive aspects of multimedia design, information architecture, attention management and human-computer interaction.

Publications 
Kirsh published several books and articles. A selection:
 1983. Representation and rationality : foundations of cognitive science. Thesis D.Phil. University of Oxford
 1992. Foundations of artificial intelligence. Edited by David Kirsh Cambridge, Mass ; London : MIT Press.
 2003. Proceedings of the Twenty-Fifth Annual Conference of the Cognitive Science Society : July 30-August 2, 2003, Park Plaza Hotel, Boston, Massachusetts, USA.  edited by Richard Alterman and David Kirsh. Cognitive Science Society (U.S.). Conference (25th : 2003 : Boston, Mass.)

Articles, a selection
 1990.  When is Information Explicitly Represented?. In: The Vancouver Studies in Cognitive Science. (1990) pp. 340–365.
1991.  Today the Earwig Tomorrow Man?. In: Artificial Intelligence. (1991).
1995. On Distinguishing Epistemic from Pragmatic Actions. (written with P. Maglio). Cognitive Science. (1995).
1995. The Intelligent Use of Space. Artificial Intelligence, Vol. 73, Number 1-2, pp. 31–68, (1995).
1995.  Complementary strategies: Why we use our hands when we think. In Johanna D. Moore and Jill Fain Lehman (Eds.) Proceedings of the Seventeenth Annual Conference of the Cognitive Science Society. pp. 212–217. 1995.
1996. Adapting the Environment instead of Oneself. Adaptive Behavior 4(3-4):415-452, 1996
1999. Distributed Cognition, Coordination and Environment Design. In: Proceedings of the European conference on Cognitive Science. 1999 pp 1–11.
2000. A Few Thoughts on Cognitive Overload, Intellectica, 2000 pp 19–51
 2003.  Implicit and Explicit Representation, Encyclopedia of Cognitive Science, 2003]
 2001. The Context of Work. In: Human computer Interaction, 2001 Vol 16(2-4), pp. 305–322
Metacognition, Distributed Cognition and Visual Design
Multi-tasking and Cost Structure: Implications for Design. In, Bruno G. Bara, L. Barsalou, & M. Bucciarelli Mahwah (Eds.), Proceedings of the 27th Annual Meeting of the Cognitive Science Society. (pp. 1143–1148) Austin, TX: Cognitive Science Society.
 2006. Distributed Cognition, A Methodological Note. Pragmatics & Cognition, 14:2 (2006), 249-262.
2009. Interaction, External Representations and Sense Making.  In N. A. Taatgen & H. van Rijn (Eds.), Proceedings of the 31st Annual Conference of the Cognitive Science Society  (pp. 1103–1108). Austin, TX: Cognitive Science Society
2009. Projection, Problem Space and Anchoring.  In N. A. Taatgen & H. van Rijn (Eds.), Proceedings of the 31st Annual Conference of the Cognitive Science Society  (pp. 2310–2315). Austin, TX: Cognitive Science Society.
2009. Knowledge, Explicit vs Implicit.  In, The Oxford Companion to Consciousness. Bayne, T., Cleeremans, A., Wilken, P. (Eds.) (pp. 397–402). Cambridge: Cambridge University Press
 2009. Problem Solving and Situated Cognition. In, Philip Robbins & M. Aydede (Eds.) (pp. 264–306) The Cambridge Handbook of Situated Cognition.  Cambridge: Cambridge University Press, 2009.
 2009. Explaining Artifact Evolution. To appear in, Cognitive Life of Things: Recasting the Boundaries of the Mind. Malafouris, L. (Ed.). McDonald Institute for Archaeological Research, Cambridge, April 7–9, 2009. Cambridge: Cambridge University press.

Courses 
Recently Professor Kirsh has taught such courses as:
 Foundations of Artificial Intelligence
 Cognitive Science 100: Cyborgs now and in the future
 Cognitive Science 87: Designing Digital Environments
 Cognitive Science 187A: Cognitive Aspects of Multimedia Design
 Cognitive Science 187B: Cognitive Aspects of Multimedia Design, Projects
 Cognitive Science 160: Creative Cognition, A Practicum in Ethnography. 
 Cognitive Science 199: Undergraduate Research on various topic about Creative Cognition and HCI.

References

External links 
 David Kirsh at UCSD
 Interactive Cognition Lab

1950s births
Living people
20th-century Canadian scientists
Canadian cognitive scientists
University of Toronto alumni
Alumni of the University of Oxford
Massachusetts Institute of Technology faculty
University of California, San Diego faculty
Stanford University faculty
21st-century Canadian scientists